Brenda Edith Ryman (6 December 1922 – 20 November 1983) was a biochemist and Mistress of Girton College, Cambridge.

Ryman was educated at Colston's Girls' School and Girton College, Cambridge. She was on the staff of the Royal Free Hospital from 1948 to 1972; Professor of Biochemistry at Charing Cross Hospital from 1972; and Mistress of Girton College, Cambridge from 1976 until her death.

References

1922 births
1983 deaths
People educated at Montpelier High School, Bristol
Physicians of the Royal Free Hospital
Physicians of Charing Cross Hospital
Alumni of Girton College, Cambridge
Mistresses of Girton College, Cambridge
Women biochemists